The guans are a number of bird genera which make up the largest group in the family Cracidae. They are found mainly in northern South America, southern Central America, and a few adjacent Caribbean islands.  There is also the peculiar horned guan (Oreophasis derbianus) which is not a true guan, but a very distinct and ancient cracid with no close living relatives (Pereira et al. 2002).

Systematics and evolution
The evolution of the group is fairly well resolved due to comprehensive analyses of morphology, biogeography, and mt and nDNA sequences (Pereira et al. 2002, Grau et al. 2005). The position of Penelopina and Chamaepetes - peculiar genera of which the former, uniquely among guans and more in line with curassows, shows pronounced sexual dimorphism - relative to each other is not determinable with certainty at present, but all evidence suggests that they are the basalmost guans. Their distribution is fairly far northwards, with 2 of their 3 species living in Central America. This indicates that the guans' origin is in the northern Andes region, in the general area of Colombia or perhaps Ecuador; the date of their initial radiation is not well resolved due to the lack of fossil evidence but can be very roughly placed around 40–25 mya (Oligocene, perhaps some time earlier). The two basal lineages diverged during the Burdigalian, around 20–15 mya.(Pereira et al. 2002)

The two larger genera diverged around the same time, spreading mainly southwards all over tropical South America in the process (Pereira et al. 2002). It appears as if the present-day distribution of the piping-guans is much relictual, due to climate changes fragmenting lowland habitat. Aburria were apparently being driven into refugia of suitable habitat time and again during the Late Pliocene by a combination of this and, possibly, competition with the more diverse and generally more adaptable Penelope (Grau et al. 2005).

If taken as a subfamily, the group also includes the chachalacas, but the horned guan is excluded and found in its monotypic subfamily.

Genera and species

References 
 , Richard; O'Neill, John Patton & Eckelberry, Don R. (1991): A guide to the birds of Trinidad and Tobago (2nd edition). Comstock Publishing, Ithaca, N.Y.. 
 Grau, Erwin T.; Pereira, Sérgio Luiz; Silveira, Luís Fábio; Höfling, Elizabeth & Wanjtal, Anita (2005): Molecular phylogenetics and biogeography of Neotropical piping guans (Aves: Galliformes): Pipile Bonaparte, 1856 is synonym of Aburria Reichenbach, 1853. Molecular Phylogenetics and Evolution 35: 637–645.  PDF fulltext
 Pereira, Sérgio Luiz; Baker, Allan J.& Wajntal, Anita (2002): Combined nuclear and mitochondrial DNA sequences resolve generic relationships within the Cracidae (Galliformes, Aves). Systematic Biology 51(6): 946–958.   PDF fulltext

Cracidae

pl:Penelopy